Rameez Junaid (born 25 May 1981) is an Australian professional tennis player of Pakistani descent.

Junaid is based in Melbourne, Victoria, and is currently ranked in the top 100 in doubles.  His doubles partners have included Philipp Marx, Adil Shamasdin and Aisam-ul-Haq Qureshi (in Dubai in 2007).

ATP career finals

Doubles: 2 (1 title, 1 runner-up)

Challenger and Futures finals

Singles: 9 (3–6)

Doubles: 73 (37–36)

Grand Slam doubles performance timeline

References

External links
 
 
 

Australian male tennis players
Naturalised citizens of Australia
Naturalised tennis players
Punjabi people
Pakistani emigrants to Australia
Tennis people from Victoria (Australia)
Living people
1981 births
Australian sportspeople of Pakistani descent
Auburn Tigers men's tennis players
Sportspeople from Faisalabad